The Democratic Party leadership election was held on 6 December 2020 for the 14th Central Committee of the Democratic Party in Hong Kong, including chairperson and two vice-chairperson posts.

Incumbent vice-chairman Lo Kin-hei was elected as chairman uncontested with 231 confidence votes, while former member of Legislative Council Lam Cheuk-ting and Kwun Tong District Councillor Edith Leung beat Shatin District Councillor Sin Cheuk-nam to become new vice-chairpersons.

Electoral method
The Central Committee was elected by the party congress. All public office holders, including the members of the Legislative Council and District Councils, are eligible to vote in the party congress. The eligibility of members electing a delegate who holds one vote in the congress was 5 members. Candidate also needs a majority in order to claim victory.

Overview
Lo Kin-hei, the incumbent vice-chairman of the party, was the only candidate for chairmanship election. Without other contestants, Lo was elected with an overwhelming of 231 votes, showing the party was highly confident with the new chairman. Lo also became the youngest party chairperson and the first without prior experience in the Legislative Council.

Election for vice-chairpersons was comparatively fierce with three candidates thriving for two seats. The three candidates were: Edith Leung from the young turks faction of the party; Lam Cheuk-ting, who just resigned from the Legislative Council; Sin Cheuk-nam, seen as Lam's apprentice.

The average age for new Central Committee is also lower. Around 10 candidates among the 27 were running for the committee for the first time. Senior party figures including ex-chairman Lee Wing-tat and former Legislative Council member Helena Wong were not on the candidate list.

Candidates

Chairperson
 Lo Kin-hei, incumbent vice-chairman of the Democratic Party, member of the Southern District Council

Vice-Chairpersons
 Lam Cheuk-ting, former member of the Legislative Council, member of the North District Council
 Edith Leung, member of the Kwun Tong District Council
 Sin Cheuk-nam, member of the Sha Tin District Council

Elections
Results are as follows according to media reports:

Results
The elected members of the 14th Central Committee are listed as following:
Chairman: Lo Kin-hei
Vice-Chairmen: Lam Cheuk-ting, Edith Leung
Treasurer: Sin Chung-kai
Secretary: Shum Wan-wa
Central Committee Members:

 Chan Po-ming
 Chan Yuk-ming
 Cheng Keng-ieong
 Chong Wing-fai
 Chow Cheuk-ki
 Chow Kam-siu
 Chow Wing-heng
 Hon Chun-yin
 Lai Kwong-wai
 Lai Chun-Wing
 Lau Chi-kit
 Leung Wing-kuen
 Mok Kin-shing
 Bonnie Ng
 Stanley Ng
 Shum Wan-wa
 Sin Chung-kai
 Tsang Tsz-ming
 Andrew Wan
 Wu Chi-wai
 Sin Cheuk-nam

References

Democratic
Democratic Party (Hong Kong)
Political party leadership elections in Hong Kong
Democratic Party (HK) leadership election